We're All Together Again for the First Time is a 1973 live album by Dave Brubeck and his quintet recorded at various locations in Europe. The album peaked at 20 on the Billboard Top Jazz Charts.

"Truth", "Unfinished Woman" and "Take Five" were recorded at the Berliner Philharmonie, "Koto Song" was recorded at the Paris Olympia and  "Rotterdam Blues" and "Sweet Georgia Brown" at the De Doelen concert hall in Rotterdam.

Reception

The album was reviewed by Scott Yanow at Allmusic who wrote that "For this very logical record, altoist Paul Desmond....makes the group a quintet and his interplay with Mulligan is consistently delightful. ...In addition, Desmond is showcased on "Koto Song" and as an encore Brubeck plays a lighthearted if brief "Sweet Georgia Brown." ."

Track listing 
 "Truth" (Dave Brubeck) - 10:29
 "Unfinished Woman" (Gerry Mulligan) - 7:26
 "Koto Song" (Brubeck) - 5:10
 "Take Five" (Paul Desmond) - 16:07
 "Rotterdam Blues" (Brubeck) - 6:51
 "Sweet Georgia Brown" (Ben Bernie, Kenneth Casey, Maceo Pinkard) - 1:12

Personnel 
 Dave Brubeck - piano, producer
 Paul Desmond - alto saxophone
 Gerry Mulligan - baritone saxophone
 Jack Six - double bass
 Alan Dawson - drums
 Siegfried Loch - producer

References

1973 live albums
Albums recorded at the Olympia (Paris)
Atlantic Records live albums
Dave Brubeck live albums
Live instrumental albums